Gunn Junhavat (born 31 December 1993) nickname Gunn, is a Thai actor, host and singer. He is best known for his role as Tar in the 2015 GTH's Hormones: The Series.

Education
He attended Srinakharinwirot University Prasarnmit Demonstration School and graduated from College of Music, Mahidol University, majoring in Music Technology (Electric Guitar).

Filmography

Film

Television series

Host

Singles

Published works

References

External links
 
 

1993 births
Living people
Gunn Junhavat
Gunn Junhavat
Gunn Junhavat
Gunn Junhavat
Gunn Junhavat
Gunn Junhavat